Genital piercing is a form of body piercing that involves piercing a part of the genitalia, thus creating a suitable place for wearing different types of jewellery. Nevertheless, the term may also be used pars pro toto to indicate all body piercings in the area of anus, perineum, genitals and mons pubis, including piercings such as anal, guiche, and pubic that do not involve perforation of genitalia. Genital piercings can be done regardless of sex, with various forms of piercings available. The main motive is beautification and individualization; in addition, some piercings enhance sexual pleasure by increasing stimulation. Pre-modern genital piercings is most culturally widespread in Southeast Asia, where it has been part of traditional practice since ancient times. Records of genital piercing are found in the Kama Sutra.

History

The traditional prehistoric and historic practice of genital piercing is most culturally widespread in Southeast Asia (particularly in Indonesia, the Philippines, Thailand, Malaysia, and Myanmar), where the insertion of various kinds of implants into the penis were common until modern times, in addition to other ancient body modifications like tattooing, supercision or circumcision, pearling, ear piercings and ear plugs, gold teeth fillings, teeth filing, teeth blackening, and artificial cranial deformation. The primary purpose of such inserts were to enhance pleasure. The practice also spread to neighboring regions, where scattered references to genital piercings exist, like the South Asian apadravya, a male genital piercing that passes vertically through the glans (unlike most Southeast Asian piercings which are inserted horizontally), in the Kama Sutra (2nd century AD). Other smaller traditions of genital piercings also arose independently in other cultures (like in Central America).

In the Philippines, penile piercings were widely documented by European explorers among the Visayan people. Visayan penile piercings consists of a rod or bar (usually made from gold, brass, tin, or ivory; and often ornamented) called the tugbuk or tudruk that is inserted horizontally through the glans of the penis. Its ends are attached to the sakra (also transcribed as sacra or sagra), a wheel or half-ring (made from the same material as the tugbuk) that goes around the head of the penis, similar to a cock ring. The sakra comes in many variants, but is usually ornamented with blunt knobs around the circumference. The ends of the tugbuk are then secured to the sakra with plugs (also often ornamented). The Italian explorer Antonio Pigafetta who accompanied Ferdinand Magellan in the first circumnavigation of the globe describes the practice as such:

The anonymously-written Boxer Codex (c.1590s) also has a similar description:

These piercings were done to boys at an early age. They were meant to enhance sensation and pleasure during sexual activity for both men and women. Notably, Pigafetta describes that it was the women who controlled how the penis with the sakra is inserted. Men without penile piercings were reported to be derided by women as asog ("impotent" or "effeminate"). The practice was heavily suppressed by the Spanish clergy and eventually lost during the Spanish colonial period of the Philippines, as it was considered by the Spanish clergy to be a "sin of the flesh."

The ampallang, a similar piercing (which also passes horizontally through the glans, but differs in that it is not attached to a ring), is found in different tribes throughout Sarawak and Sabah on the island of Borneo. Genital piercings became first introduced in western countries by ethnographic report, done by explorers such as in the 19th century. The Dutch explorer Anton Willem Nieuwenhuis described in his ethnographic record In Centraal Borneo: reis van Pontianak naar Samarinda – documenting his travel through Borneo in 1897 – the procedure of an ampallang piercing:

Piercing the genitals became a short-lived trend at the end of the 19th century, in particular for upper classes of the society: "It was during the Victorian era that the practice of body piercing in the Western world reemerged. Many men and women of the Victorian royalty chose to receive nipple and genital piercings.″

However, the popularity diminished again, with genital piercings becoming rather uncommon in the western world until the second half of the 20th century. In the 1970s, they were introduced to the emerging body modification community by the early piercings pioneers like Jim Ward and Doug Malloy, many of them associated with the legendary piercing studio The Gauntlet in Los Angeles. With the advent of Piercing Fans International Quarterly in 1977, information about genital piercings became available to a wider community. Genital piercings were later sported by the modern primitives movement that developed during the 1980s in the San Francisco Bay Area. Still, only until the 21st century, genital piercing was confined to a body modification subculture.

Just like nipple piercings, genital piercings became increasingly more popular and part of mainstream culture in the second decade of the 21st century, with ″nice and normal″ people endorsing them.  Many celebrities such as Christina Aguilera, Fantasia Barrino, Pete Doherty, Janet Jackson, Lenny Kravitz, Katarina Waters, or Pete Wentz, stated that they had or planned to have genital piercings. Genital piercings nowadays have a growing demand, especially in a young adult, college-aged population.

With regard to (female) genital piercings, Marilyn W. Edmunds, adjunct clinical professor at the Johns Hopkins University, stated, "Women with genital piercings are no longer on the social fringe or part of the 'punk' culture who are experimenting with behaviors that are 'socially provocative.' Over the past 30 years, genital piercing has become mainstream, and women engage in it for a variety of reasons."

However, according to Chelsea Bunz, professional piercer from UK, the clearly existing rise in popularity might as well be an effect of more people openly talking about their genital piercings: "I think genital piercing has always been popular – it's just discussed more openly these days, which makes it increasingly acceptable to the mainstream. People from all classes and professions have them (...)."

Motives

Like body piercings at large, genital piercings are often done for aesthetic reasons and as an expression of personal style. In addition, some (but not all) types of genital piercing increase sensitivity and provide additional stimulation during sexual intercourse or stimulation. According to an Association of Professional Piercers expert report by Elayne Angel, body piercing pioneer, former member of The Gauntlet and inventor of several genital piercings such as the fourchette and the lorum, individual motives and preferences are quite diverse:

Aesthetic reasons 
Motivation can be restricted purely to aesthetic taste. Like all other types of body piercing, genital piercings are decorative, appealing to the people wearing them. Violet Fenn of Metro stated, "For me personally, it was sheer aesthetics – I just like how it looks. Even if I was the only person who ever saw my piercing, I’d like it in the same way that I like having painted toenails – something pretty for my own personal pleasure.″

Culture and life style

Traditional cultures 
In many traditional cultures, these piercings are done as a rite of passage during adolescence and, symbolically and literally, mark the admittance to the adult world and serve as a marker of cultural identity. Similar to religiously motivated circumcision, it may be regarded as a "purification of the flesh" and a common bodily sign to members of the same faith. These traditional meanings of modifying the body were revived in contemporary western society by the modern primitive. Inspired by ethnographic accounts of tribal practices, this subculture adopted genital piercings as a matter of individuation and spirituality.

Contemporary western society 
For most people that seek genital piercings nowaday, a sense of uniqueness and non-conformism prevails. In a 2015 study that evaluated a qualitative dataset of 484 self-reports and characteristics of men and women with genital piercings came to the conclusion that:

Enhanced pleasure and sensation 
Additionally, genital piercings can enhance sexual pleasure during masturbation, foreplay and intercourse. While female genital piercings do this only to the women wearing them, male genital piercings can enhance stimulation for both the person wearing the jewelry and their partner by stimulating both the glans of the wearer and the vaginal wall or the anus of the penetrated partner. Due to genital physiology, women seem to gain more sexual pleasure from both, their own as well as her partner's genital piercings.

For the sexual partner 
This effect is in particular reported for piercings passing through the glans penis: the ampallang and apadravya piercing. Women of the Dayak in Sarawak, Borneo prefer men with an ampallang, claiming that intercourse without would be dull:

Paolo Mantegazza stated, "The Dayak women have a right to insist upon the ampallang and if the man does not consent they may seek separation. They say that the embrace without this contrivance is plain rice; with it is rice with salt."
On another account by the anthropologist Tom Harrisson, who spent much of his life in Borneo and interviewed natives about the traditional ampallang; he stated, "the function of this device is, superficially, to add to the sexual pleasure of the women by stimulating and extending the inner walls of the vagina. It is, in this, in my experience, decidedly successful."

For the pierced person 
For men, piercings that stimulate the sensitive urethra, either during masturbation or sexual intercourse, increase sensation.
Female genital piercings that are reported to enhance pleasure are the piercings that pass through or close to the clitoris, i.e. the clitoris piercing and the clitoral hood piercing. In an empirical study at the University of South Alabama, the authors reported a positive relationship between vertical clitoral hood piercings and desire, frequency of intercourse, and sexual arousal. However, this might depend on many factors such as placement, jewelry shape, and the individual. The triangle piercing is known to be quite pleasurable by providing stimulation of the underside of the clitoral glans, an area that is usually not stimulated at all.

Potential health risks 
Comparable to other piercings, improper hygiene during the piercings process carries the risk of transmitting blood borne diseases and during the healing process it might lead to infection.

Some physicians believe that male genital piercings increase the risk of STD transmission by making safer sex barriers (condoms) less effective. Most professional piercers and body art enthusiasts believe these risks are over-stated or nonexistent. In two surveys, 5%–18% of men with genital piercings reported unspecified "problems using condoms" though it is unclear how many of these men used condoms regularly. There is no conclusive evidence that wearers of genital piercings are more likely to contract sexually transmitted infections.

Aftercare 
The time to fully heal a genital piercing varies tremendously, depending on piercing site and individual characteristics: it can range from a week up to six months. Until fully healed, preparations should be made against possible causes of infection, such as proper cleaning on a daily basis. People with fresh piercings should abstain from sexual activity for the first few days and also then should use physical protection barriers such as condoms until the piercing is fully healed.

Legal considerations 
Laws in other countries vary. In many European countries, minors are required to bring a signed consent form from or to be escorted by a legal guardian. Even in countries that have no laws regulating genital piercing in minors, many piercers refrain from doing them (since physiological development is not completed in minors). In the United States, it is prohibited to pierce the genitals of persons younger than 18 years.

Types of genital piercings

Male genital piercings

Possible piercing sites on the male genitalia include the glans, the skin of the penis shaft, the scrotum or the perineum.

Glans penis

Piercings through the glans of the penis include the ampallang, which passes horizontally, and the apadravya, that passes vertically through the glans. The Prince Albert piercing is situated on the ventral side (underside) of the penis immediately behind the glans, while the reverse Prince Albert piercing passes through the dorsal (top) side of the glans. The dydoe pierces through the coronal rim of the glans. With the exception of the dydoe, all these piercings traditionally pass through the urethra. This is preferred because healing time and incidence of infection are reduced by the flow of sterile urine.

These piercings provide increased stimulation during intercourse to the male  (who is carrying the piercing) as well as to the partner. Piercings through the head, or the glans, are the genital piercings with the best-documented historical evidence.

Skin of the penis shaft and scrotum

Foreskin piercing passes through the penile prepuce on the dorsal, ventral or lateral side. It is required that the male isn't circumcised. The frenum piercing passes through the penile frenum, a small skin bridge that connects the glans with the shaft skin. This anatomical part is also often missing in circumcised men. The hafada piercing is situated on the skin of the scrotum. As an intermediate version between frenulum and hafada, the lorum piercing (low frenum) sits at the point where penis and scrotum connect. The Jacob's Ladder is a ladder from frenum to scrotum. The guiche piercing is a body piercing on the perineum. These piercings play a lesser role in adding stimulation and more or less fulfill only a decorative purpose.

Female genital piercings
In female individuals as well, various anatomical parts can be suitable for piercings. These include the mons pubis, the clitoral hood, the (inner and outer) labia and the vulval vestibule (which is the area surrounding the vaginal opening).

Clitoris and clitoral hood

The glans of the clitoris itself can be pierced. Since this anatomical part is too small in many cases, this piercing is not very common. In contrast, the clitoral hood piercing is the most common genital piercing for female bodied individuals. It can be applied horizontally and vertically. The deep hood piercing is a variation of the clitoral hood piercing that pass deeper through the clitoral hood. The Isabella piercing passes vertically through the clitoral shaft and is rather complicated to pierce.

Labia and vulval vestibule

Labia piercing can be applied to the labia majora or the labia minora. The triangle piercing is located at the ventral end of the labia minora, at the point of transition between labia and clitoral hood. It runs horizontally, partly under the clitoral shaft. The fourchette piercing passes through the dorsal rim of the vulval vestibule. A less common version of the fourchette piercing is the suitcase piercing which can be considered as a deeper version of the fourchette because it enters through the perineum. Also rather uncommon is the Princess Albertina piercing, the female version of the Prince Albert piercing, that passes through the ventral (lower) wall of the urethra.

Mons pubis

The Christina piercing is a surface piercing, situated on the upper part of the mons pubis where the outer labia meet. It is similar to the Nefertiti piercing, that can be seen as a combination between vertical clitoral hood piercing and Christina piercing.

Unisex genital piercings
Body piercings that do not involve perforation of genitalia but referred to as "genital piercings" by convention can be worn by all sexes. These include the pubic piercing, which is situated above the penis in males and on the mons pubic in females (comparable to the Christina piercing, but horizontally). The guiche piercing passes horizontally through the perineum while the anal piercing passes through the anus.

See also
 Bikini waxing
 Chastity piercing
 Cock ring
 Genital modification and mutilation 
 Genital jewellery
 Genital tattooing
 Nipple piercing
 Play piercing

References

Citations

Sources

External links

General information 
Elayne Angel: An approach to genital piercings. published by the Association of Professional Piercers:
General issues
Clitoral hood and labia piercings
Prince Albert and pubic piercings
Frenum, Lorum, Hafada and Guiche
Foreskin, Dydoe, Ampallang and Apadravya

Body modification